Greenfield Park (1921) is a park in West Allis, Wisconsin, Milwaukee County in the United States. The park features a lake, aquatic recreation areas and a golf course which was added in 1923. The park was added to the Wisconsin Architecture and History Inventory in 2011.

History
The land which makes up Greenfield Park was purchased by Milwaukee County, Wisconsin in 1921. Fifteen years later the park land included 278 acres. The park was surveyed in 2011 and added to the Wisconsin Architecture and History Inventory. The park is on the western county line bordering Greenfield, Wisconsin. In 1923 a golf course which was added to the park: it was updated in 2015.

On March 19, 1928, the park's golf clubhouse was destroyed by a fire. The Park Commission stated that the building insurance nearly covered the loss, and they planned to build a new clubhouse which would be ready for the 1929 golf season.

Description
The park now includes 282.3 acres and features a lagoon with a 0.6 mile circumference and a golf course. The golf course covers  The park also features an aquatic park with pools and splash pads.

See also
Parks of Milwaukee

References

Milwaukee County, Wisconsin
County parks in Wisconsin
Protected areas of Milwaukee County, Wisconsin
Urban public parks
Geography of Milwaukee
Tourist attractions in Milwaukee